Luigi Pogliana (25 January 1945) was an Italian professional footballer who played as a  defender.

Honours
Napoli
 Coppa Italia champion: 1975–76.

References

1945 births
Living people
People from Legnano
Italian footballers
Footballers from Lombardy
Serie A players
Serie B players
A.C. Legnano players
Novara F.C. players
S.S.C. Napoli players
Association football defenders
Sportspeople from the Metropolitan City of Milan